A plastic igniter cord (PIC) is a type of fuse used to initiate an explosive device or charge. In appearance igniter cord is similar to safety fuse and when ignited, an intense flame spits perpendicular to the cord at a uniform rate as it burns along its length. Igniter cord in the construction and demolition industry is similar to a safety fuse, consisting of a pyrotechnic composition at the core, wrapped with a nylon sheath to provide shape and finally wrapped again in an outer plastic shell to provide water resistance. Normally, igniter cord also consists of a metal wire at the very center of the pyrotechnic core which also runs the entire length of the cord; the pyrotechnic composition will react with the metal wire (typically aluminum, iron or copper) to increase the energetics of the fuse. There are two types of PICs: the fast type which has nominal burning speed of 30 cm per second, a diameter of about 3 mm, and is brownish in color; and the slow type, which has a diameter of 2 mm, is greenish in color, and has a nominal burning speed of 3 cm per second.

See also 
 fuse (explosives)
 Detonating cord

Detonators
Explosives